Bryn Mawr, pronounced  ,
from Welsh for big hill, is a census-designated place (CDP) located across three townships: Radnor Township and Haverford Township in Delaware County, and Lower Merion Township in Montgomery County, Pennsylvania, United States. It is located just west of Philadelphia along Lancaster Avenue, also known as U.S. Route 30.

There are also areas not in the census-designated place but which have Bryn Mawr, Pennsylvania postal addresses, including Radnor Township and Haverford Township in Delaware County.

Bryn Mawr is located toward the center of what is known as the Main Line, a group of affluent Philadelphia suburban villages stretching from the city limits to Malvern. They became home to sprawling country estates belonging to Philadelphia's wealthiest families, and over the decades became a bastion of old money.  As of the 2010 census, it had a population of 3,779. Bryn Mawr is home to Bryn Mawr College.

History

Bryn Mawr is named after an estate near Dolgellau in Wales that belonged to Rowland Ellis. He was a Welsh Quaker who emigrated in 1686 to Pennsylvania to escape religious persecution.

Until 1869 and the coming of the Pennsylvania Railroad's Main Line, the town, located in the old Welsh Tract, was known as Humphreysville. The town was renamed by railroad agent William H. Wilson after he acquired on behalf of the railroad the  that now compose Bryn Mawr.

In 1893, the first hospital, Bryn Mawr Hospital, was built on the Main Line by Dr. George Gerhard.  Glenays, a historic home dating to 1859, was listed on the National Register of Historic Places in 1977.

Geography
Bryn Mawr is located at  (40.021022, −75.316901).

Part of Bryn Mawr is located in Delaware County, located at the coordinates 40°1' 25.0212"N 75°19' 46.1676"W; its ZIP code is 19010, with a total population of 3,779.

However, the Bryn Mawr ZIP Code of 19010 covers a larger area. As a result, the geographic term Bryn Mawr is often used in a sense that includes not only the CDP, but also other areas that share the ZIP Code. These other areas include the community of Rosemont within Lower Merion Township and Radnor Township, and various other areas within Lower Merion Township, Radnor Township, and Haverford Township. Bryn Mawr is a part of the Philadelphia Main Line, a string of picturesque towns located along a railroad that connects Philadelphia with points west. Some other Main Line communities include Ardmore, Wynnewood, Narberth, Bala Cynwyd and Villanova

Demographics

As of the 2010 census,, there were 3,779 people, 1,262 households, and 497 families residing in the CDP. The population density was 7,033.7 people per square mile (2,728.9/km2). There were 1,481 housing units at an average density of 2,377.2/sq mi (922.3/km2). The racial makeup of the CDP was 74.0% White, 10.5% Black or African American, 0.0% Native American, 10.7% Asian, 0.1% Pacific Islander, 1.2% from other races, and 3.6% from two or more races. 4.9% of the population were Hispanic or Latino of any race. 21.1% were of Irish, 10.8% Italian, 6.8% German and 6.4% English ancestry according to Census 2000.

There were 1,404 households, out of which 13.5% had children under the age of 18 living with them, 26.8% were married couples living together, 8.9% had a female householder with no husband present, and 62.6% were non-families. 41.1% of all households were made up of individuals, and 13.7% had someone living alone who was 65 years of age or older. The average household size was 2.07 and the average family size was 2.79.

In the CDP, the population was spread out, with 8.4% under the age of 18, 48.1% from 18 to 24, 21.0% from 25 to 44, 12.1% from 45 to 64, and 10.5% who were 65 years of age or older. The median age was 22 years. For every 100 females, there were 46.5 males. For every 100 females age 18 and over, there were 42.4 males.

As of the U.S. census, the median income for a household in the CDP was $47,721, and the median income for a family was $66,369. Males had a median income of $40,625 versus $31,618 for females. The per capita income for the CDP was $23,442. About 5.3% of families and 21.7% of the population were below the poverty line, including 23.6% of those under age 18 and 2.5% of those age 65 or over.

As of the 2000 census, the Bryn Mawr ZIP code was home to 21,485 people with a median family income of $110,956.

Notable people

Constance Applebee, athletic director at Bryn Mawr College for 24 years
Julius Wesley Becton Jr., retired US Army general, former Federal Emergency Management Agency Director, and education administrator
John Bogle, founder and former CEO of The Vanguard Group
Avis Bohlen, U.S. Ambassador to Bulgaria (1996-1999)
Derek Bok, lawyer, educator, president of Harvard University
George W. Childs, publisher, co-owner of Philadelphia Public Ledger
Jake Cohen (born 1990), American-Israeli basketball player for Maccabi Tel Aviv and the Israeli national basketball team
Meredith Colket, silver medalist in pole vault, 1900 Olympics
Samuel Conway, chemist and Anthrocon chairman
Fran Crippen, swimmer
A. J. Croce, musician
Kat Dennings, actress
Mark DiFelice, MLB player for Milwaukee Brewers
Fred D'Ignazio, educator and technology writer
H.D. (Hilda Doolittle), imagist poet, novelist, memoirist
Adelaide C. Eckardt, Maryland politician
Bernard Farrell, former chairman of 550/Sony Music Entertainment, founder of StarHouse Records
Drew Gilpin Faust, historian of American Civil War, first female president of Harvard University, graduated from Bryn Mawr College
Emmet French, golfer
Jim Gardner, Philadelphia WPVI-TV news anchorman
Adam Goren, punk-rock musician known as Atom and His Package
Phil Gosselin, Major League baseball player
Hanna Holborn Gray, historian of Germany, first female president of University of Chicago, graduated from Bryn Mawr College
Edith Hamilton, classics scholar, author of The Greek Way and The Roman Way, graduated from and taught at Bryn Mawr College
Philip A. Hart, US Senator from Michigan, 1959–76, nicknamed "the Conscience of the Senate"
Katharine Hepburn, actress, four-time Academy Award recipient, graduated from Bryn Mawr College
Agathe Lasch, Jewish German linguist, first female professor of German studies at a German university, taught at Bryn Mawr College
Edward Barnes Leisenring Jr., coal executive
Daniel Pratt Mannix IV, author of The Fox and the Hound
Jayne Mansfield, actress
Jacqueline Mars, heiress to Mars, Inc. candy bar fortune
Tim McCarver, Major League baseball player and broadcaster
Walter A. McDougall, Pulitzer Prize winner
Agnes Nixon, creator of One Life to Live and All My Children
Emmy Noether, mathematician
Michael A. O'Donnell, Ph.D, author, lecturer, and Episcopal priest, born here
Richard A. O'Donnell, playwright, composer, lyricist, poet, actor, and stand-up comic
R. C. Orlan, baseball player
Teddy Pendergrass, singer
Chris Pikula, professional Magic: The Gathering player
Elizabeth Plater-Zyberk, University of Miami professor of architecture and New Classical advocate
Polly Platt, author of books for Americans living in France
Jake Schindler, professional poker player
Beth Shak, professional poker player for Full Tilt
Jay Sigel, professional golfer, U.S. Amateur champion
Cornelia Otis Skinner, playwright and actress, graduated from Bryn Mawr College
Ed Snider, founder of Comcast Spectacor
John Spagnola, former professional football player
Andrew Spence, artist
Richard Swett, former congressman and diplomat
Dr. Joseph Wright Taylor, industrialist, Quaker leader, founder and benefactor of Bryn Mawr College
Jack Thayer, first class passenger and survivor of sinking of RMS Titanic
M. Carey Thomas, second president of Bryn Mawr College
 Cheryl Abplanalp Thompson, Team USA handball player in 1996 Summer Olympics, inductee into Davis and Elkins College Hall of Fame
Charles Thomson, secretary of Continental Congress, lived at Harriton House
Ronne Troup, actress
Emlen Tunnell, NFL player for New York Giants and Green Bay Packers, member of Pro Football Hall of Fame
Woodrow Wilson, 28th president of the United States, taught government at Bryn Mawr College, then at Princeton University, and later served as governor of New Jersey
Warren Zevon, musician
Anthony Zinni, US Marine Corps general

School system
Bryn Mawr residents of Lower Merion Township attend schools in the Lower Merion School District; all residents of the Bryn Mawr CDP are in Lower Merion Township and therefore attend LMSD schools.
Bryn Mawr address residents of Radnor Township attend schools in the Radnor Township School District; Radnor High School is the district's sole high school.
Bryn Mawr address residents of Haverford Township attend schools in the School District of Haverford Township; Haverford High School is the district's sole high school.
Sacred Heart Academy Bryn Mawr, the Shipley School and The Baldwin School are all in Bryn Mawr. The French International School of Philadelphia, which opened in 1991, previously held its classes at Baldwin and then at Shipley.

Points of interest

Bryn Mawr College
Harcum College
Sacred Heart Academy Bryn Mawr
Baldwin School
Shipley School
Barrack Hebrew Academy
Clarke Schools for Hearing and Speech, formerly Clarke School for the Deaf.  "Clarke Philadelphia" is located here, with its main campus being in Northampton, Massachusetts.
American College Arboretum
The American College of Financial Services
Bryn Mawr Campus Arboretum
Bryn Mawr Film Institute
Harriton House
The Main Point

References

Census-designated places in Montgomery County, Pennsylvania
Census-designated places in Pennsylvania
Lower Merion Township, Pennsylvania
Philadelphia Main Line
Welsh-American culture in Pennsylvania